Daniele Verde (born 20 June 1996) is an Italian professional footballer who plays as a winger for Serie A club Spezia.

Club career

Roma 
Born in Naples, Verde is a youth product from Roma. Verde featured for the A.S. Roma Primavera side that qualified for the knockout stage of the 2014–15 UEFA Youth League, finishing 2nd in their group, Verde scoring twice in the group stage, both coming in wins against CSKA Moscow.

Verde made his senior debut on 17 January 2015 in the Serie A fixture against Palermo, replacing Juan Iturbe after 75 minutes of a 1–1 away draw. On 8 February 2015, Verde starred on his first start for Roma, playing 90 minutes as they won 2–1 away at Cagliari, with Verde assisting both of Roma's goals, for Adem Ljajić and Leandro Paredes.

On 9 July 2015, he was officially transferred on loan to Frosinone. On 6 January 2016, he was transferred on loan to Serie B side Pescara for the remainder of the 2015–16 season. On 15 July, fellow Serie B side Avellino confirmed that Verde had joined on loan from Roma. Verde played from start to finish in Avellino's 2–0 away defeat against Bassano Virtus in round one of the 2016–17 edition of the Coppa Italia on 7 August.

On 8 August 2018, Verde joined to Spanish La Liga club Real Valladolid on loan until 30 June 2019 with an option to buy.

AEK Athens 
On 16 July 2019, AEK Athens agreed with Roma for the transfer of the young winger to the Greek club for an estimated transfer fee of €1 million, plus a resale rate of 30%. Verde signed a three-year contract, earning €750,000 per year and will be given the number 7 shirt, upon request. The following day, AEK officially announced the acquisition of the Italian winger. On 7 December 2019, he scored his maiden goal for the Athens-based club with a stunning free kick which beat Jérémy Malherbe with the help of the right post, in a hammering 5–0 home win game against Panionios. On 5 January 2020, Daniel Verde came on after the restart and gave a new wind to the home side, and he deservedly added his name to the scoresheet with AEK's second penalty of the game with eight minutes remaining, sealing a 3–1 home win game against Panetolikos. On 23 February 2020, Verde scored a brace with clinical side-footed finish, as a resurgent AEK Athens continued their impressive form with a convincing 3–0 home win over OFI.

On 14 June 2020, he came in as a substitute and scored with an excellent left-footed strike, sealing a 2–0 away win against OFI. On 12 July 2020, he converted a penalty in a 3–1 away win against Panathinaikos.

Spezia 
On 22 September 2020, AEK officially announced that the Italian winger completed a move to Spezia. AEK received €300,000 from the loan, with a mandatory purchase of €800,000.

International career
On 29 September 2014, Verde received his first call up to the Italy U19 squad for the 2015 UEFA European Under-19 Championship qualifying round fixtures against Armenia, Serbia and San Marino in October 2014. Verde featured in all three game as Italy U19 qualified for the elite round to be played in 2015, scoring in the 3–0 victory against Armenia on 10 October 2014.

He made his debut with the Italy U21 on 12 August 2015, in a friendly match against Hungary.

Career statistics

Club

Honours
AEK Athens
 Greek Cup runner-up: 2019–20

References

External links

JustFootball.com

1996 births
Living people
Italian footballers
Italy under-21 international footballers
Italy youth international footballers
Association football forwards
A.S. Roma players
Frosinone Calcio players
Delfino Pescara 1936 players
U.S. Avellino 1912 players
Hellas Verona F.C. players
Real Valladolid players
AEK Athens F.C. players
Spezia Calcio players
Serie A players
Serie B players
La Liga players
Super League Greece players
Italian expatriate footballers
Italian expatriate sportspeople in Spain
Italian expatriate sportspeople in Greece
Expatriate footballers in Spain
Expatriate footballers in Greece